Pakubuwono III (also transliterated Pakubuwana III) (1732–1788) was the third Susuhunan (ruler of Surakarta). Also known as Sinuhun Paliyan Negari He was proclaimed by the Dutch as ruler of Mataram in 1749, but when the state was divided into the states of Surakarta and Yogyakarta in 1755, he was proclaimed as the first Susuhanan of Surakarta.

Notes

References
Miksic, John N. (general ed.), et al. (2006)  Karaton Surakarta. A look into the court of Surakarta Hadiningrat, central Java (First published: 'By the will of His Serene Highness Paku Buwono XII'. Surakarta: Yayasan Pawiyatan Kabudayan Karaton Surakarta, 2004)  Marshall Cavendish Editions  Singapore  

Burials at Imogiri
Susuhunan of Surakarta
1732 births
1788 deaths
Indonesian royalty